"Three Billy Goats Gruff" is a Norwegian fairy tale collected by Peter Christen Asbjørnsen and Jørgen Moe in their Norske Folkeeventyr, first published between 1841 and 1844. It has an Aarne-Thompson type of 122E.  The first version of the story in English appeared in George Webbe Dasent's translation of some of the Norske Folkeeventyr, published as Popular Tales from the Norse in 1859. The heroes of the tale are three male goats who need to outsmart a ravenous troll to cross the bridge to their feeding ground.

Plot
The story introduces three Billy goats (male goats), sometimes identified as a youngster, father and grandfather, but more often described as brothers. In other adaptations, there is a baby or child goat, mama goat and papa goat.  "Gruff" was used as their family name in the earliest English translation, by Dasent; the original Norwegian version used the name "Bruse".

In the story, there is almost no grass left for them to eat near where they live, so they must cross a river to get to "sæter" (a meadow) or hillside on the other side of a stream to eat and fatten themselves up. They must first cross a wooden bridge, under which lives a fearsome and hideous troll, who is so territorial that he eats anyone who tries to cross the bridge.

The smallest billy goat is the first to cross and is stopped abruptly by the troll who threatens to "gobble him up!" The little goat convinces the troll to wait for his big brother to come across, because he is larger and would make for a more gratifying feast. The greedy troll agrees and lets the smallest goat cross.

The medium-sized goat passes next. He is more cautious than his brother but is also stopped by the troll and given the same threat. The second billy goat is allowed to cross as well after he tells the troll to wait for his father because he is the largest of the three.

The largest billy goat gets on the bridge but is also stopped by the hungry troll who threatens to devour him. The largest billy goat challenges the troll and dares him to do so. Then the troll jumps up. The big billy goat gruff knocks him off the bridge with his horns. The troll falls into the stream and is carried away by the current and drowned. From then on the bridge is safe and all three goats are able to go to the rich fields around the summer farm in the hills. The three billy goats Gruff eat lots of grass and live happily ever after.

Adaptations and cultural references

Audiobooks
 Scholastic Corporation produced an audio recording in 1963, with music composed and directed by Arthur Rubinstein, narrated by Bob Thomas, and cover illustration by Susan Blair and Ellen Appleby. It was first made available as a phonograph record, and then on Compact Cassette.
 TaleThings offers a storybook program ("app") for iOS and Android mobile devices that is a humorous retelling of the classic tale. It features animated visuals and narration in any of six languages.

Comics 
 Bill Willingham's 2002 comic book Fables contains mention of the goats, and the troll is an ongoing character.
 Pierry Radrik's 2020 One comic book.

Films
 In the Norwegian film Trollhunter (2010), the title character attempts to bait a troll by placing three goats on a bridge.
 Mike Flanagan's Kickstarter-funded film Absentia (2011) is a modern-day retelling centred around a tunnel, a series of abductions, and a troll-like creature.
 "Team Juan" at the Duncan of Jordanstone College of Art and Design at the University of Dundee produced a version with a Spanish twist on the story: The 3 Billy Piñatas (2015).
 In My Neighbour Totoro (1988) the eponymous creature Totoro is named after misspelling 'Toro-ru', which means 'troll' in Japanese. In the end scene is a book of the story "Three Billy Goats Gruff" with Totoro on it visible, indicating that Totoro is named after this story.
 In Toy Story 4 (2019), it is revealed that Bo Peep's three-headed sheep, previously unnamed, were named "Billy", "Goat", and "Gruff", after the story.

Games
 The tale also comes into play during the first King's Quest (1983) game. A troll is guarding a bridge Graham needs to cross. The optimum solution to the puzzle is to lure a goat over to the bridge. Upon seeing the troll, the goat is angered, and butts it into the river below.
 The tale also comes into play during Magicland Dizzy (1990). A troll is guarding a bridge Dizzy needs to cross. He says the only way to cross is to give him 30 diamonds before kicking Dizzy in the air away from him, but this is a red herring, as there are 30 in the whole game with one behind him and many in the Ice Palace afterwards. The only solution to the puzzle, is to cut the rope holding the goat using the dagger, before hitting him with the stick to make him charge towards the troll. Along his way, the goat butts the troll into the air.
 The tale is also included in the video game Simon the Sorcerer (1993).
 In the video game The Elder Scrolls V: Skyrim (2011), near a place called Purewater Run, there is a stone bridge near a waterfall. If it is the player's first time there, they will see three goats; upon looking under the bridge, they will find a dead troll.
 In 2016 Saturn Animation Studio has produced an interactive adaptation of Three Billy Goats Gruff for mobile devices.
 A game adaptation for tablets and mobile phones is developed by the Norwegian game studio Agens. The game was made with support from the Norwegian Film Institute in 2011.
 In the card game Magic: The Gathering, a card named "Clackbridge Troll" was printed in the 2019 expansion Throne of Eldraine. In its art, a troll is seen looming over three goats on a bridge.

Literature
 An abbreviated version of this tale is used in "3-Part Puzzle" by Gordon R. Dickson, translated into an ET language as "The THREE (Name) (Domestic Animals) (Name)" (and the (horrendous, carnivorous, mythical creature)). The ET Envoy is puzzled over the glee that children show over this "simple and boring" "lesson in tactics".
 Stephen King's It (1986) alludes to this story.
 Golden Books did a version of the story that was similar to the book. The only difference is that when the troll is washed away by the stream, he is later mentioned to have moved into a cave.
 Terry Pratchett's Discworld novel Lords and Ladies (1992) refers to this story, as does a joke made in the first chapter of Monstrous Regiment (2003).
 Neil Gaiman adapted the story for Snow White, Blood Red (1993), an anthology of children's fairy tales retold for adults. In Gaiman's version (entitled "Troll Bridge"), the troll approaches a young boy who has crossed his bridge and demands to "eat his life." The boy eventually persuades the troll to wait until he has lived a little more, after which he will return to the bridge. The goats in this adaptation are represented by the protagonist as a child, a teenager and finally a middle-aged man. The story was nominated for a 1994 World Fantasy Award.
 The Billy Goats Gruff make an appearance in Jim Butcher's book Small Favor (2008), the tenth novel of the Dresden Files series .
 Andri Snær Magnason's retells the story in the children's book Tímakistan (2013). This variant features a kid, its mother, and her husband. When the mother goat tells the troll to eat her husband instead of her, "the troll lost his appetite. 'What's the world coming to?', he cried. 'The kid tells me to eat its mother, and she tells me to eat her husband! Crazy family!'." The troll goes home leaving the goats uneaten.
 The tale is the inspiration of Kevin P. Futers's novel The Adventures of the Billy Goats Gruff, which is set in seventh-century Northumbria and includes goats named Edgar, Bert, and Frith.
 Writer Bjørn F. Rørvik and illustrator Gry Moursund has created three books in Norwegian based on this the story. The first one, Bukkene Bruse på badeland (The Three Billy Goats Gruff at the Waterpark), came in 2009 and had by 2014 sold over 110,000 copies in Norway, making it one of the biggest selling picture books in the country. By March 2019 the three books had sold over 450,000 copies in Norway.
 Part of the story in the children's book The Troll by Julia Donaldson is based on the tale, with a troll that lives varying bridges and waits for goats but in this story only other animals walk over the bridges.

Music
 A musical version of the story written and performed by Frank Luther was often played on the BBC Radio programme Children's Favourites, in the 1950s and early 1960s.
 The tale appears to be cryptically referenced in the song "John Brown" (1988) by indie-rock band Masters of Reality. The lyrics are usually understood to be "John Brown, bring him down; pull his body to the ground. Left him up, for long enough; let me be the Baby Gruff."
 James Scott Balentine composed Kinderkonzerts, a chamber music setting for string quintet and narrator, with the text adapted by Stephanie Sant’Ambrogio, for the Cactus Pear Music Festival.
 The song "Much Chubbier" by Nerdcore rapper MC Frontalot on his album Question Bedtime (2014) is a retelling of the story.

Stage productions
 Gwen Edwards adapted the story into a popular children's musical called Billy, Goat, Gruff: The Musical (summer 2007), at Barter Theatre in Abingdon, Virginia.
 Lazy Bee Scripts published Billy Goat Gruff (2009), a simple play for young children.
 A musical adaptation by British composing team George Stiles and Anthony Drewe was commissioned by the Singapore Repertory Theatre. It premiered there in 2015 and made its North American debut in 2017 at the Aurora Theatre in Lawrenceville, Georgia.

Television
 In 1994, Animaniacs, for its second season premiere, did its own parody of the story in the short "Take My Siblings, Please!". In the story, the goats are portrayed by the Warner Brothers and their sister, Dot. In the end, Yakko simply whacks the troll with a giant mallet.
 In 1996, the TV show Aaahh!!! Real Monsters told its version of the Three Billy Goats Gruff in the episode "Oblina and the Three Humans". In this telling, the goats are represented by humans and the monster under the bridge is the main character of the story.
 In 2004, the story is retold on Hi-5. This version has the goats replaced by sheep and instead of the troll wanting to eat them, he just wanted to sleep and was annoyed by their noise. The story ended with the biggest sheep giving him earmuffs made out of wool. In the original Australian version of the show, the troll is replaced with a Bunyip.
 Between the Lions had a few episodes about the characters reading the story.
 In 2008, the BBC created a modern adaptation for its Fairy Tales TV series. In this, the story was given a twist in that the troll was presented as a tragic, cruelly maligned victim:

 In the April 19, 2015 segment about "patent trolls" of Last Week Tonight with John Oliver, it is referenced with "trolls actually do something, they control bridge-access for goats and ask people fun riddles".
 In the TV Series Thomas & Friends an episode named "Three Steam Engines Gruff" is a reference to this story.

Hiking Trails
  Oak Mountain State Park near Birmingham, Alabama has a hiking trail and bridge named after the eponymous bridge in the story.

References

External links

 
 
 
 Norwegian version, ePub and audio books in Speex format available.
 SurLaLune website: annotated Three Billy Goats Gruff in the version from Peter Christen Asbjørnsen and Jørgen Moe, Popular Tales from the Norse George Webbe Dasent, translator. Edinburgh: David Douglass, 1888.
 Three Billy Goats Gruff with other regional variations and 122E stories.

Norwegian fairy tales
Fiction about goats
Norwegian folklore
Animal tales
Trolls in popular culture
ATU 100-149
Asbjørnsen and Moe